Cymindis hookeri is a species of ground beetle in the subfamily Harpalinae. It was described by Henry Walter Bates in 1875.

References

hookeri
Beetles described in 1875